Kyu Blu Kelly (born May 22, 2001) is an American football cornerback for the Stanford Cardinal.

Early life and high school
Kelly grew up in Las Vegas, Nevada, and attended Bishop Gorman High School. He was named first team All-State as a senior. Kelly was rated a three-star recruit and committed to play college football at Stanford over offers from Arizona State, Cal, UCLA, Oregon, and Utah.

College career
Kelly became a starter four games into his freshman season. He was named honorable mention All-Pac-12 Conference as a sophomore. Kelly was named second team All-Pac-12 after making 58 tackles with a league-high 13 passes defended and two interceptions during his junior season. He repeated as a second team All-Pac-12 selection as a senior. After the season, Kelly announced that he would enter the 2023 NFL Draft.

Personal life
Kelly's father, Brian Kelly, played cornerback at USC and in the NFL for 11 seasons.

References

External links
Stanford Cardinal bio

Living people
American football cornerbacks
Stanford Cardinal football players
Players of American football from Nevada
Year of birth missing (living people)